The Bashful Bachelor is a 1942 American film directed by Malcolm St. Clair. It is the second of seven films based on the Lum and Abner radio series created by and starring Chester Lauck and Norris Goff.

Plot
Small town store owner Lum Edwards (Chester Lauck) in Pine Ridge has a thorn in his side because his partner in the Jot-em-Down general store, Abner Peabody (Norris Goff), has exchanged the store delivery car for a race track horse. And because Lum doesn't have the guts to approach the woman he is in love with, Geraldine (ZaSu Pitts), and propose to her once and for all, he lays a complex scheme to impress her in a fake "rescue" mission. He fails tremendously in this mission, and nearly gets everyone killed in doing so. However, he doesn't give up, but tries again, and finally succeeds in impressing her. His problems continue when his proposal, to be delivered to Geraldine by his partner Abner, is instead delivered to a very prone bachelorette, Widder Abernathy (Constance Purdy). She jumps at the possibility of marrying Lum, and the game is afoot. Lum doesn't get out of trouble until the town sheriff (Irving Bacon) finds widow Widder's disappeared husband.

Cast
Chester Lauck as Lum Edwards
Norris Goff as Abner Peabody
ZaSu Pitts as Geraldine
Grady Sutton as Cedric Wiehunt
Oscar O'Shea as Squire Skimp
Louise Currie as Marjorie
Constance Purdy as Widder Abernathy
Irving Bacon as Sheriff / Fire Chief
Earle Hodgins as Joseph Abernathy
Benny Rubin as Pitch Man

External links

References

1942 films
1940s English-language films
American black-and-white films
Films based on radio series
Films set in Arkansas
1942 comedy films
RKO Pictures films
American comedy films
Films directed by Malcolm St. Clair
1940s American films
Lum and Abner